Club Deportivo La Virgen del Camino is a Spanish football team based in La Virgen del Camino, Valverde de la Virgen, Province of León, in the autonomous community of Castile and León. Founded in 1998 it currently plays in Tercera División – Group 8, holding home games at Estadio Municipal Los Dominicos, which has a capacity of 1,500 spectators.

Season to season

10 seasons in Tercera División
1 season in Tercera División RFEF

References

External links
Official website 
La Preferente team profile 

Football clubs in Castile and León
Association football clubs established in 1998
1998 establishments in Spain
Province of León